Antoshikha is a rural locality (a selo) in Masalsky Selsoviet, Loktevsky District, Altai Krai, Russia. The population was 106 as of 2013. There are 2 streets.

Geography 
Antoshikha is located on the Paseka River, 35 km southeast of Gornyak (the district's administrative centre) by road. Kryuchki and Masalsky are the nearest rural localities.

References 

Rural localities in Loktevsky District